Tonspion (e.g. "tone spy") is the first German MP3 blog founded in 1998 in Cologne, Germany and moved to Berlin in 2001. The editorial team is reviewing the best free MP3 Downloads on the web, offering links to the source of the download, usually artists and labels. Due to strong copyrights and a monopolist collecting society it is not legally possible to host free downloads on webpages and blogs in Germany. However it is legal to link to websites that offer free promotional downloads, so Tonspion became the first German guide for free downloads all over the World Wide Web.

In 2001 Tonspion set up an English website under the name "Tonespy" with an own team of editors, which was temporarily discontinued in 2003 due to the different legal situation in the US and the UK. Tonspion is now planning to re-open an English version of Tonspion in 2010.

Tonspion has a team of five editors and an office in Berlin. It now works with all big major companies in Germany and with many independent labels that embraced MP3 promotion although many labels were having issues with giving away free music at the start of Tonspion.
Tonspion was nominated twice (2005 and 2006) for the Grimme Online Award, the most important award for online media in Germany and is still the only German MP3 music magazine, offering a free download to any music review.

In 2009 Tonspion relaunched the website, now offering free preview streams for all albums and downloads in partnership with 7digital. New features include a tourguide, videos and newsfeeds of the best music blogs in German and English language.
Nowadays Tonspion is one of the most respected music magazine in Europe.

References

External links
Tonspion - Free MP3 Downloads
Erfolgreiche Agenten Berliner Zeitung 21 May 2001
Surftipp: Frischzellenkur für den Musik-Spion Spiegel Online 28 April 2009
MP3 für Fortgeschrittene Netselektor.de 30 September 2009

1998 establishments in Germany
German-language magazines
Online music magazines published in Germany
Magazines established in 1998
Magazines published in Berlin
Mass media in Cologne